Alexander W. Baldwin (1835–1869) was an American judge.

Alexander Baldwin may also refer to:

 Alec Baldwin (Alexander Rae Baldwin III; born 1958), American actor
 Alexander & Baldwin, American company

See also
Alex Baldwin (born 1969), also known as Talon, American pornographic actor, member of the AVN Hall of Fame
W. E. B. Griffin (1929–2019), American writer who used the pseudonym Alex Baldwin